Kristian Gyldenstein (16 July 1886 – 11 January 1954) was a Danish footballer. He played in three matches for the Denmark national football team from 1911 to 1933.

References

External links
 

1886 births
1954 deaths
Danish men's footballers
Denmark international footballers
Place of birth missing
Association footballers not categorized by position